Plaza de Toros La Macarena is a bullring in Medellín, Colombia. It is currently used for bull fighting and concerts. The stadium holds 15,000 spectators. It was opened in 1945.

References

Macarena
Sports venues completed in 1945
Buildings and structures in Medellín
Sport in Medellín
1945 establishments in Colombia